The men's pole vault event  at the 1982 European Athletics Indoor Championships was held on 7 March.

Results

References

Pole vault at the European Athletics Indoor Championships
Pole